Zasław may refer to:

 Historical name for Zasłaŭje, a historic town in Minsk Province, Belarus
 Historical name for Iziaslav (also Zaslav), Ukraine
Zasław concentration camp, a Nazi concentration camp in Zasław (now part of Zagórz), Poland
Neal Zaslaw (born 1939), American musicologist

See also

Zaslav (disambiguation), alternative spelling
Zasławski family